The Socialist Party of Cameroon (PSC) was a political party in Cameroon.

History
The party was established in November 1959 by former Senator Charles Okala. 

Together with the Cameroonian National Action Movement, the PSC formed the Group of Cameroonian Progressives to contest the 1960 elections. The alliance received 4.5% of the vote, winning seven seats. The alliance joined Ahmadou Ahidjo's Cameroonian Union-led government in May 1960, with Okala becoming and Foreign Minister.

After being convicted of conspiracy, Okala was imprisoned in 1962. He was released in 1965, with a condition that the PSC be dissolved. It merged into the Cameroon National Union in September 1966.

References

Defunct political parties in Cameroon
Political parties established in 1959
1959 establishments in French Cameroon
Political parties disestablished in 1966
1966 disestablishments in Cameroon